Knyazevo is a rural locality (a village) in Ufa, Bashkortostan, Russia. The population was 891 as of 2010. There are 13 streets.

References 

Rural localities in Ufa urban okrug